Slidell may refer to:

Places
 Slidell, Louisiana
Slidell Town Hall
 Slidell Airport
 Slidell station
 Slidell High School (Louisiana)
 Slidell, Texas
 Slidell High School (Texas)
 Slidell Independent School District

People
 John Slidell
 Slidell's proposal